The Togolese records in swimming are the fastest ever performances of swimmers from the Togo, which are recognised and ratified by the Fédération Togolaise de Natation.

All records were set in finals unless noted otherwise.

Long Course (50 m)

Men

Women

Short Course (25 m)

Men

Women

References

Togo
Records
Swimming